The Cross Tay Link Road is a road-construction project in Perth and Kinross, Scotland. It will involve a three-span bridge over Scotland's longest river, the Tay, hence the project's name. A cycle path will run parallel to the bridge's carriageway.

The project, which is expected to cost £118 million, is the second phase of the Perth Transport Futures Project, which was formed to "address the key issues identified in the Perth Traffic and Transport Issues Scottish Transport Appraisal Guidance".

Study 

A 2010 study predicted that traffic increases would exceed Perth's capacity, while also highlighting physical limitations caused by local geography (such as Kinnoull Hill and the River Tay) and existing infrastructure (such as the Highland Main Line railway). An assessment, completed in 2016, selected a corridor to the north of the city that should be taken into consideration for the purpose of traffic remediation. The route was approved at a meeting of Perth and Kinross Council in December 2016.

It is the first major road project in the vicinity of Perth since the construction of the Friarton Bridge, which was completed in 1978, and it will be the largest to date.

Objective 
According to Sweco, the Swedish engineering consultation company, the project will help reduce traffic congestion in Perth's city centre, particularly on the A989 (the city's Inner Ring Road) and in Bridgend, on the eastern side of the River Tay. It is also expected to promote sustainable travel.

Environmental impact 
Sweco acknowledges that the construction methods that are necessary in all facets of the project pose environmental risks. As a result, the construction process will be an important part of the environmental impact assessment.

Opponents of the project, in particular the residents of Scone, believe it will have a "devastating impact" on the countryside.

Ramblers and the Scottish Rights of Way and Access Society voice disapproval that several core paths will be closed during the construction process.

The ecology at the Highfield Plantation Woodland, north of Scone, will be given its own "green bridge" to safely cross the new construction.

Timeline 
The proposed start date of the project was late 2021, with an expected completion date of 2024; preparatory work did not begin until late January 2022, however.

In June 2022, it was announced that a  speed limit would be in place on a four-mile stretch of the A9 for eighteen months.

Surrey-based BAM Nuttall were appointed the contractors for the project in 2021.

References

External links 

 Perth Transport Futures official website

Roads in Scotland
Transport in Perth and Kinross